Valiabad (also Romanized as Valīābād) is a village/residential complex in Rudpey-ye Shomali Rural District, in the Central District of Sari County, Mazandaran Province, Iran. This place is known for its luxurious villas and also its quiet streets shaded by pine and willow trees. valiabad is located within khazar abad and tuqdar. Its 30 kilometres away from sari and its 500 metres far from the caspian sea. In the year 2022 its estimated population is 1028

References 

Populated places in Sari County